The Boundary Creek, a perennial stream of the Clarence River catchment, is located in the Northern Rivers region of New South Wales, Australia.

Course and features
The river flows generally northeast before reaching its confluence with the Glen Fernaigh River.

See also

 Rivers of New South Wales
 List of rivers of New South Wales (A-K)
 List of rivers of Australia

References

 

Rivers of New South Wales
Northern Rivers